Alessandro Sbrizzo (born 11 April 1975 in Italy) is an Italian retired footballer.

Career

After not getting paid by U.S. Savoia 1908, receiving offers from Serie C clubs with unsatisfactory financial conditions, and being disillusioned with the controversies and violence surrounding football, Sbrizzo retired aged 30. In addition, his career was hampered by  injuries and he desired to become a coach.

While vacationing as a player, Sbrizzo travelled to the United States and decided to buy a house there. Eventually, he became a coach at the A.C. Milan academy in Miami before returning to Italy.

References

External links
 Alessandro Sbrizzo at Carriere calciatori

Association football defenders
Living people
Italian footballers
1975 births
S.S.C. Napoli players
Reggina 1914 players
Calcio Padova players
Delfino Pescara 1936 players
U.S. Savoia 1908 players
Footballers from Naples